The Olympus AZ-4 Zoom is a 35mm fixed-lens SLR camera introduced in 1989.

Overview
It appeared in the 1989 Batman film. It is almost identical to the Ricoh Mirai, except it does not have a remote control socket and uses different batteries. It has a built in zoom lens which zooms from 35 to 135mm in approximately 52 steps. The zoom lens moves slowly compared to modern 35mm cameras, and the autofocus is slower and less reliable. However, the images it can achieve are of a very high standard particularly in terms of sharpness.

It has the following features usually only found on SLR cameras:

Real image viewfinder
Manual focussing mode
Exposure adjustment
Shutter speed adjustment
Hotshoe for external flash

It has the following features usually only found on compact cameras:

Autofocus
Built in pop up flash
Self timer (Timer to take photo 10 seconds after shutter is pressed)
Fill-in flash

It also has the following features
LCD
Beeps when autofocus locks
Tripod socket

Some models use 2 123 size lithium batteries. The version marketed by Ricoh can accept a large lithium battery or four AAA size batteries. There is also a Quartz date model, and the back on a regular model can be removed and replaced with a data back.

AZ-4 Zoom